Luis Rechani Agrait (June 22, 1902 in Aguas Buenas, Puerto Rico – December 12, 1994 in San Juan, Puerto Rico), was a Puerto Rican poet, journalist, and playwright.

After schooling in Aguas Buenas and Río Piedras, Rechani Agrait moved to the US to study Natural Sciences at Harvard and Richmond.  Returning to Puerto Rico in 1924, he worked on various newspapers (particularly El Mundo and El Nuevo Día) and in teaching.

His literary work can be situated as part of the "Generation of the 1930s," and paid particular attention to social and historical issues.

Publications 
 Páginas de color de rosa: Libro de lectura para segundo año (1928) (book intended for second graders)
 Una nube en el viento (1929) (poems for children)

Plays 
 Mi señoría (1940)
 Todos los ruiseñores cantan (1964)
 ¿Cómo se llama esta flor? (1965)
 Tres piraguas en un día de calor (1970) - an evening of three-one act comedies (El Tesoro, La Compañía, El Pececito Dorado)
 Llora en el atardecer la fuente (1971)
 ¡Oh, dorada ilusión de alas abiertas! (1978)
 El extraño caso del señor Oblomós (1981) - based on the novel Oblonov, by Russian writer Ivan A. Goncharov

See also 

List of Puerto Rican writers
List of Puerto Ricans
Puerto Rican literature

External links
 brief biography

1902 births
1997 deaths
People from Aguas Buenas, Puerto Rico
Puerto Rican writers
Harvard University alumni